Franz Christoph Neubauer (c. 1760 - 11 October 1795) was a German composer and violinist of Bohemian origins, possibly born in Hořín near Mělník. He died in Bückeburg.

Bibliography

External links
 

1760 births
1795 deaths
18th-century German composers
18th-century German male musicians
German classical composers
German male classical composers
German violinists
German people of Czech descent
String quartet composers